is a Japanese former ski jumper. He competed in the normal hill and large hill events at the 1976 Winter Olympics.

Career 
On 8 March 1973, at the official training of the 2nd FIS Ski Flying World Championships, he crashed at ski jumping world record distance at 176 metres (577 ft) on Heini-Klopfer-Skiflugschanze in Oberstdorf, West Germany.

He performed in World Cup only one time in his career, in the inaugural season at home in Sapporo where he took 9th place and three times at Four Hills Tournament with no visible success.

World Cup

Standings

Invalid ski jumping world record

*Not recognized. Crashed at world record distance.

References

External links 

1952 births
Living people
Japanese male ski jumpers
Olympic ski jumpers of Japan
Ski jumpers at the 1976 Winter Olympics
Sportspeople from Hokkaido